Borilovo-2 is a rural locality (a village) in Prilukskoye Rural Settlement, Vologodsky District, Vologda Oblast, Russia. The population was 2 as of 2002.

Geography
Borilovo-2 is located 15 km north of Vologda (the district's administrative centre) by road. Semenkovo-2 is the nearest rural locality.

References 

Rural localities in Vologodsky District